Rodrigo Elias Martínez Abed, best known as Rodrigo Abed (born September 6, 1970) is a telenovela and film actor. He is best known as "Fabián Sanchez Serrano" in Cuando seas mia.

Career 
He studied acting at the "Centro de Educación Artística" (Artistic Education Center) of Televisa in Mexico, where he is the student of Sergio Jimenez and Oscar nominated actress, Adriana Barraza. He was part of Star System of Televisa.

Actor

Film
2005 Cicatrices
2003 Dark Waters

Telenovela
La mexicana y el güero (2020) - Gonzalo Heredia
Silvia Pinal, frente a ti (2019) - Psicólogo
El Chapo (2017) - Amado
El Chema (2017) - Cesár Silva de la Garza "El Presidente (The President)"
 Amor sin reserva (2014-2015) - Jorge Castillo
Las trampas del deseo (2013-2014) - Gerardo Alvarado
El señor de los cielos (2013) - Cesár Silva de la Garza "El Presidente (The President)"
A corazón abierto (2011-2012) - Javier Burgos
Secretos del alma (2008 - 2009) - Roberto Suárez
Top Models (2005) - Brandon Oliver
La hija del jardinero (2003) - Guillermo
Mirada de mujer: El regreso (2003) - Elias Tanus
Súbete a mi moto (2002)
Cuando seas mía (2001 - 2002) - Fabián Sánchez Serrano Vallejo
 Besos prohibidos  (1999) - Adalberto Conde
La Mentira (1998) - Ricardo Platas †  
Mujer, casos de la vida real (1997-1998) - Varios capítulos
Cañaveral de pasiones (1996) - Guillermo Elizondo
Morir dos veces (1996)
María la del Barrio (1995 - 1996) - Bernardo Garduño
El premio mayor (1995 - 1996) - Gustavo
Bajo un mismo rostro (1995) - Mario Contreras
Sueño de amor (1993)
Mágica juventud (1992) - "El puas"

References

External links
TV Azteca web page about the actor's work

1972 births
20th-century Mexican male actors
21st-century Mexican male actors
Mexican male telenovela actors
Mexican male film actors
Mexican male stage actors
Mexican male television actors
Mexican people of Syrian-Jewish descent
Male actors from Mexico City
Living people